No Me Compares Con Nadie (Don't compare me to anyone) is the eighth album by Colombian singer-songwriter Silvestre Dangond and the seventh and the last with the accordionist, Juancho De la Espriella, released by Sony Music on August 31, 2011. In November 25 at the same year, the album received Diamond certification in Colombia for the strong sales.

Track listing

Charts and sales

Weekly charts

Sales and certifications

!scope="row"|Colombia (ASINCOL)
|Diamond
|200,000
|-
|}

References

2011 albums
Sony Music Colombia albums
Sony Music Latin albums
Spanish-language albums
Silvestre Dangond albums